The Sarawak Malaysian People's Association or Persatuan Rakyat Malaysia Sarawak (PERMAS) is now a defunct Malaysian political party based in Sarawak.The party itself was formed in 1987, during the infamous 1987 Ming Court Affair, by a faction dissatisfied with the Chief Minister Abdul Taib Mahmud, led by his own uncle, Former Governor and Chief Minister, Tun Abdul Rahman Ya'kub.

During the 1987 State Election, PERMAS were able to win 5 seats, alongside its ally Sarawak Dayak People's Party or Parti Bansa Dayak Sarawak (PBDS). However, they failed to unseat Taib from the State Government, and they tried again in 1991. However, things were no longer in their favour, as the Barisan Nasional, led in Sarawak by Taib, had an overwhelming victory, gaining 49 out of 56 seats in the State Legislative Council. The crushing defeat marked the end of PERMAS, and it was later dissolved.

Notable Leaders
 Tun Datuk Patinggi Haji Abdul Rahman Ya'kub
 Datuk Salleh Jafaruddin 
 Datuk Bujang Ulis @ Bujang Hadziri
 Haji Samat Taba

General election results

State election results

References

Political parties established in 1987
Political parties disestablished in 1991
Defunct political parties in Sarawak
1987 establishments in Malaysia
1991 disestablishments in Malaysia